, professionally known by her mononym  is a Japanese dancer, model and actress. She is a member of the J-Pop group Happiness and a former member of E-girls and an exclusive model for CanCam.

Kaede is represented with LDH.

Early life
Kaede was born on January 11, 1996, in Yokosuka, a city located in Kanagawa Prefecture, Japan. She has a younger brother and a younger sister.

She started dancing during her fourth year of elementary school, she later went to a dance school in Yokosuka, in which she was introduced to Exile's Tetsuya as her instructor, and went to the Exile Professional Gym (EXPG) in Tokyo during her first year in junior high school. Afterwards, she appeared at Exile's events, music videos and on tour as a background dancer.

Career 
In October 2008, a new performance group called Happiness was formed by EXPG graduates. Kaede was chosen to be one of their members and started her activities as a dancer stylized as KAEDE.

Kaede made her modelling debut in the March issue of the fashion magazine Glamorous in 2011. Happiness made their major debut with the single "Kiss Me" on February 9. Later in April, Kaede, as well as all the other members of Happiness, were announced to become members of E-girls. They would be having a concurrent position between the group and Happiness.

Kaede later became an exclusive model for the fashion magazine CanCam in its September issue in July.

In January 2014 she made her acting debut in the Nippon TV series A Perfect Day for Love Letters alongside other members of E-girls. Later that year she also made her first solo appearance in the drama Shark: 2nd Season.

Kaede appeared on the cover of CanCam'''s June issue in April 2015. This was her first magazine cover since her debut as a model and the first time a member of E-girls appeared on a women's magazine cover by herself. Since then, she has been chosen as the cover model for CanCam several times.

On August 29, 2017, she released her first photobook titled Nee, Kiite!!.

On March 1, 2019, it was announced that Kaede, Ruri and Sayaka were appointed as ambassadors for DeNA's YOKOHAMA GIRLS☆FESTIVAL 2019 Supported by ありあけ 横濱ハーバー from May 31 to June 2. For this occasion, Kaede threw the opening pitch for the baseball game on the first day of the festival. On April 23, 2019, she was also chosen as one of the representative E-girls members alongside Harumi Sato, Nozomi Bando and Nonoka Yamaguchi for the advertisements of Mister Donut's Tapoica Drink "Tap！Tap！Tapioca！", a new product released on the same day. On September 1 in the same year, Kaede announced her collaboration with fashion accessory brand Hash feat.#F for the release of a collection of designer phone cases.

Personal life
Starting as a nickname from the fans, they became the official model-duo Twin Tower. Kaede also co-starred with Harumi in Aoyama One Seg Kaihatsu.
In March 2014, in the Sankei Sports article "Watashitachiha Hontō no Performance o Todokeru koto o Mezashite iru. Idol de wa naku, Girls Performance Group desu." in which the members of E-girls were interviewed, she said that she has a sense of incongruity when she is an idol.

Filmography
To see her appearances with Happiness, see Happiness (Japanese band); to see her appearances with E-girls, see E-girls

TV dramas

Films

 Other 

 YOKOHAMA GIRLS☆FESTIVAL 2019 Supported by ありあけ 横濱ハーバー'' - Ambassador

References

External links

 

Japanese female dancers
Japanese female models
21st-century Japanese actresses
People from Kanagawa Prefecture
1996 births
Living people
LDH (company) artists